The United Arab Emirates men's national basketball team represents the United Arab Emirates in international basketball. They are controlled by the United Arab Emirates Basketball Association.

The UAE made its debut in international competition at the 1982 Asian Games. Furthermore, the national team has qualified to the FIBA Asia Cup eight times, with their best result coming in 1997, where they finished fifth. The UAE has also competed at the Arab Nations Cup muiltiple times, where they had their top performance in 1997, winning bronze.

History
The United Arab Emirates played in their first international match at the 1982 Asian Games. The group stage fixture win against North Yemen, was one of only two victories for the team against four losses during the event; which saw the team miss out on making it to the medal round. After the tournament, the team would not appear at an international competition until the 1990 Asian Games, where the team would only achieve modest results.

Three years later, the United Arab Emirates made their debut at the top continental competition, the 1993 FIBA Asia Cup. Placed into Group B during the preliminary phase, the UAE won two out of their three matches for a record of (2–1) to advance into the quarter-finals. However, the UAE would lose a narrowly contested match against Iran 73–77, to relegate the team to the classification rounds to finish out the tournament. After nearly reaching the semi-finals at the first FIBA Asia Cup tournament the UAE took part in, the team was back at the next edition of the event in 1995. Stationed in Group B once again, the UAE, however, would only win one of their preliminary phase matches; which came against the Philippines 70–56, to be sent to the classification stages for the second straight tournament. There, the team would pickup four more victories to close out the competition in ninth place.

Behind subpar performances at their first two FIBA Asia Cup competitions, the United Arab Emirates entered the tournament in 1997, determined to gain better results. After completely dominating India, and Bangladesh in their first two preliminary phase matches, the team fell in a close defeat to South Korea 73–72. Although with the two wins, the team automatically advanced into the quarter-final round. Entering the phase, the UAE would only prevail in one of their three matches, a 77–59 win against Jordan. The loss for the team would send them into the classification fifth place game, where they would earn one more victory to end the competition. After the tournament, the UAE would make the competition five more times over the next 14 years through the 2011 edition, accumulating only disappointing outcomes.

Competitive record

FIBA World Cup

Asian Games

FIBA Asia Cup

Results and fixtures

2022

2023

Team

Current roster
Roster for the 2025 FIBA Asia Cup Pre-Qualifiers matches in February 2023 against Kuwait, Iraq and Palestine.

Depth chart

Head coach position
  Mounir Ben Slimane – (2005–2009)
  Zoran Zubčević – (2010–2015)
  Mounir Ben Slimane – (2016–present)

Past rosters
2011 FIBA Asia Cup: finished 10th among 16 teams

See also

Sport in United Arab Emirates
United Arab Emirates national under-18 basketball team
United Arab Emirates national under-17 basketball team
UAE National Basketball League

Notes

References

External links
Official website 
UAE FIBA profile
UAE National Team – Men at Asia-basket.com
UAE Basketball Records at FIBA Archive

 
1976 establishments in the United Arab Emirates